Solomon Crocodile is a 2011 picture book by Catherine Rayner. It is about a mischievous crocodile called Solomon who wants to play with various birds and animals but just annoys them until he finally meets another playful crocodile.

Reception
Booktrust, in a review of Solomon Crocodile, wrote that "Catherine Rayner's lovely artwork vividly depicts a lively cast of animal characters in this gorgeous picture book," found similarities in the illustrations to those of Quentin Blake, and concluded, "this is a picture book to treasure." The Scottish Book Trust called it a "beautifully illustrated picture book," while The Horn Book Magazine and a King County librarian recommended it for storytime.

Solomon Crocodile has also been reviewed by Kirkus Reviews, Books for Keeps, Publishers Weekly, AARP, Booklist, and School Library Journal.

Awards
 2012 Kate Greenaway Medal - shortlist
 2012 Scottish Children's Book Award - nominee
 2014 CPNB Picture Book of the Year - winner

Solomon and Mortimer
Rayner wrote a sequel, Solomon and Mortimer in 2016. It involves Solomon and his new buddy Mortimer, the crocodile that Solomon met at the end of the previous book, getting up to further mischief.

See also
 The Enormous Crocodile

References

2011 children's books
British picture books
Fictional crocodilians
British children's books
Animal tales